Edward Murphy (July 26, 1818 – December 5, 1895) was a Canadian politician.

Born in County Carlow, Ireland, he emigrated to Lower Canada when he was six. He was appointed to the Senate for the division of Victoria, Quebec on the advice of Sir John A. Macdonald in 1889. A Liberal-Conservative, he served until his death in 1895.

In 1882, he was made a Knight of the Order of the Holy Sepulchre.

There is an Edward Murphy fonds at Library and Archives Canada.

References

1818 births
1895 deaths
Canadian senators from Quebec
Conservative Party of Canada (1867–1942) senators
Irish emigrants to pre-Confederation Quebec
Politicians from County Carlow
Knights of the Holy Sepulchre
Immigrants to Lower Canada